Anne George may refer to:
Anne George (biologist)
Anne George (writer) (1927–2001), American author and poet

See also
Ann George (1903–1989), British actress